Parihuzovce is a village and municipality in Snina District in the Prešov Region of north-eastern Slovakia.

History
In historical records the village was first mentioned in 1567.

Geography
The municipality lies at an altitude of 445 metres and covers an area of 9.521 km². According to the 2013 census it had a population of 32 inhabitants.

External links
 
http://www.statistics.sk/mosmis/eng/run.html

Villages and municipalities in Snina District
Zemplín (region)